Wombeyan Caves Road is a New South Wales country road linking Mittagong near Hume Highway in the east to Goulburn-Oberon Road at the locality of Richlands in the west.

Route
At its eastern end, the road starts at Old Hume Highway just west of Mittagong. Access from the north of Mittagong is via Mittagong, while access from the south is via the half interchange at the southern end of the Mittagong Bypass section of Hume Highway. It passes through farmland and the locality of High Range as a sealed road. Further west, it changes to unsealed and continues through farmland before entering the Wombeyan Caves area. The road conditions deteriorate substantially as the road goes further west until it reaches the main Wombeyan Caves reserve camping area. West of the camping area, the road is sealed as it climbs a tight, winding section up the mountain side. At the top of that hill, the road reverts to unsealed but is wider and straighter. Close to its western end, the road is a reasonable standard sealed road. This road has no major intersections.

Wombeyan Caves Road goes through the following settlements, from east to west: Mittagong, High Range, Wombeyan Caves and Richlands. The road is allocated Tourist Route 13, from its western end at Richlands to the turn-off to Wombeyan Caves.

History
The road passes through a historical single lane tunnel carved through the sandstone ridge in a forest area part way through the farmland section. The tunnel is around 22 m long at ground level, but has a sandstone outcrop extending several metres further at its western end. In August 1899 the local newspaper, Goulburn Evening Penny Post, described the progress of "work of tunnelling through the sandstone ridge at the gullies near Bullio is being rapidly pushed on by a gang of experienced men, who are using ratchet drills and other improved appliances, so that this portion of the work will be completed in about six weeks". In late January 1900 the new road was opened, J. H. Young (ex-Minister of Works) proposed that "[it] should be named the Duprez-road in honor of a worthy citizen-who had worked hard to secure it-Mr. A. P. Duprez, of Bowral".

A plaque at the eastern end of the tunnel states: "This tunnel was completed during 1899 as part of a new tourist road linking the southern highlands to Wombeyan Caves. Officially opened on 29 January 1900, the road was originally named Duprez Road in honour of Adolphe Prosper Duprez of Bowral who was the driving force behind its construction."

Road classification
The passing of the Main Roads Act of 1924 through the Parliament of New South Wales provided for the declaration of Main Roads, roads partially funded by the State government through the Main Roads Board (later the Department of Main Roads, and eventually Transport for NSW). Main Road No. 258 was declared along this road on 8 August 1928, from the intersection with Hume Highway near Mittagong via Wombeyan Caves to Oberon-Taralga Road (today Goulburn-Oberon Road) to Richlands.

The passing of the Roads Act of 1993 updated road classifications and the way they could be declared within New South Wales. Under this act, Wombeyan Caves Road today retains its declaration as Main Road 258, from Mittagong to Richlands.

Road conditions
Due to the extremely poor condition of the road for several kilometres east of the Wombeyan Caves camping area, it is strongly recommended to access the caves reserve from the Goulburn-Oberon Road.  Regardless of the impression that might be given by road maps, the road should not be considered to be a through road unless you are in a 4WD or have a lot of time.  The Hume Highway and Goulburn-Oberon Road via Goulburn are a better option if you are not aiming to get to somewhere between the Wombeyan Caves camping area and the sandstone tunnel west of High Range.
However, if one takes their time a normal family car can do the trip but care must be taken on bends.

Please check on the status of the road before driving it as the portion down to and up from the Wollondilly River can often become extremely rutted and washed out, blocked by large fallen boulders or eroded so badly it becomes unpassable and is closed. On 30 January 2015 the local council had closed the road to all traffic between Goodmans Ford (where the road crosses the Wollondilly River) and Langs Road due to significant parts of the road having been washed away down the cliff.

As of 13 November 2015, Wombeyan Caves Road has reopened after months of repairs to the damaged section of road approximately 11 kilometers west of the Goodman's Ford crossing. However motorists should still exercise caution as the road is largely unsealed and some sections are still very rough.

Gallery

See also

 Highways in Australia
 List of highways in New South Wales

References

Highways in Australia
Roads in New South Wales